Stoic physics refers to the natural philosophy of the Stoic philosophers of ancient Greece and Rome which they used to explain the natural processes at work in the universe.

To the Stoics, the cosmos is a single pantheistic god, one which is rational and creative, and which is the basis of everything which exists.  Nothing incorporeal exists. The nature of the world is one of unceasing change, driven by the active part or reason (logos) of God which pervades all things. The active substance of the world is characterized as a 'breath', or pneuma, which provides form and motion to matter, and is the origin of the elements, life, and human rationality. The cosmos proceeds from an original state in utmost heat, and, in the cooling and separation that occurs, all things appear which are only different and stages in the change of primitive being. Eventually though, the world will be reabsorbed into the primary substance, to be consumed in a general conflagration (ekpyrôsis), out of which a new cycle begins again. 

Since the world operates through reason, all things are determined. But the Stoics adopted a compatibilist view which allowed humans freedom and responsibility within the causal network of fate. Humans are part of the logos which permeates the cosmos. The human soul is a physical unity of reason and mind. The good for a human is thus to be fully rational, behaving as Nature does in the natural order.

Central tenets
In pursuing their physics the Stoics wanted to create a picture of the world which would be completely coherent. Stoic physics can be described in terms of (a) monism, (b) materialism, and (c) dynamism.

Monism
Stoicism was a pantheistic philosophy. The cosmos is active, life-giving, rational and creative. It is a single cohesive unit, a self-supporting entity containing within it all that it needs, and all parts depending on mutual exchange with each other. Different parts of this unified structure are able to interact and have an affinity with each other (sympatheia). The Stoics explained everything from natural events to human conduct as manifestations of an all-pervading reason (logos). Thus they identified the universe with God, and the diversity of the world is explained through the transformations and products of God as the rational principle of the cosmos.

Materialism
Philosophers since the time of Plato had asked whether abstract qualities such as justice and wisdom, have an independent existence. Plato in his Sophist dialogue (245e–249d) had argued that since qualities such as virtue and vice cannot be 'touched', they must be something very different from ordinary bodies. The Stoics' answer to this dilemma was to assert that everything, including wisdom, justice, etc., are bodies. Plato had defined being as "that which has the power to act or be acted upon," and for the Stoics this meant that all action proceeds by bodily contact; every form of causation is reduced to the efficient cause, which implies the communication of motion from one body to another. Only Body exists. The Stoics did recognise the presence of incorporeal things such as void, place and time, but although real they could not exist and were said to "subsist". Stoicism was thus fully materialistic; the answers to metaphysics are to be sought in physics; particularly the problem of the causes of things for which Plato's theory of forms and Aristotle's "substantial form" had been put forth as solutions.

Dynamism
A dualistic feature of the Stoic system are the two principles, the active and the passive: everything which exists is capable of acting and being acted upon. The active principle is God acting as the rational principle (logos), and which has a higher status than the passive matter (ousia). In their earlier writings the Stoics characterised the rational principle as a creative fire, but later accounts stress the idea of breath, or pneuma, as the active substance. The cosmos is thus filled with an all-pervading pneuma which allows for the cohesion of matter and permits contact between all parts of the cosmos. The  pneuma is everywhere coextensive with matter, pervading and permeating it, and, together with it, occupying and filling space.

The Epicureans had placed the form and movement of matter in the chance movements of primitive atoms. In the Stoic system material substance has a continuous structure, held together by tension (tonos) as the essential attribute of body. This tension is a property of the pneuma, and physical bodies are held together by the pneuma which is in a continual state of motion. The various pneuma currents combining give objects their stable, physical properties (hexis). A thing is no longer, as Plato maintained, hot or hard or bright by partaking in abstract heat or hardness or brightness, but by containing within its own substance the material of these pneuma currents in various degrees of tension.

As to the relation between the active and the passive principles there was no clear difference. Although the Stoics talked about the active and passive as two separate types of body, it is likely they saw them as merely two aspects of the single material cosmos. Pneuma, from this perspective, is not a special substance intermingled with passive matter, but rather it could be said that the material world has pneumatic qualities. The diversity of the world is explained though the transformations and products of this eternal principle.

Universe

Like Aristotle, the Stoics conceived of the cosmos as being finite with the Earth at the centre and the moon, sun, planets, and fixed stars surrounding it. Similarly, they rejected the possibility of any void (i.e. vacuum) within the cosmos since that would destroy the coherence of the universe and the sympathy of its parts. However, unlike Aristotle, the Stoics saw the cosmos as an island embedded in an infinite void. The cosmos has its own hexis which holds it together and protects it and the surrounding void cannot affect it. The cosmos can, however, vary in volume, allowing it to expand and contract in volume through its cycles.

Formation
The pneuma of the Stoics is the primitive substance which existed before the cosmos. It is the everlasting presupposition of particular things; the totality of all existence; out of it the whole of nature proceeds, eventually to be consumed by it. It is the creative force (God) which develops and shapes the universal order (cosmos). God is everything that exists.

In the original state, the pneuma-God and the cosmos are absolutely identical; but even then tension, the essential attribute of matter, is at work. In the primitive pneuma there resides the utmost heat and tension, within which there is a pressure, an expansive and dispersive tendency. Motion backwards and forwards once set up cools the glowing mass of fiery vapour and weakens the tension. Thus follows the first differentiation of primitive substance—the separation of force from matter, the emanation of the world from God. The seminal Logos which, in virtue of its tension, slumbered in pneuma, now proceeds upon its creative task. The cycle of its transformations and successive condensations constitutes the life of the cosmos. The cosmos and all its parts are only different embodiments and stages in the change of primitive being which Heraclitus had called "a progress up and down".

Out of it is separated elemental fire, the fire which we know, which burns and destroys; and this condenses into air; a further step in the downward path produces water and earth from the solidification of air. At every stage the degree of tension is slackened, and the resulting element approaches more and more to "inert" matter. But, just as one element does not wholly transform into another (e.g. only a part of air is transmuted into water or earth), so the pneuma itself does not wholly transform into the elements. From the elements the one substance is transformed into the multitude of individual things in the orderly cosmos, which is itself a living thing or being, and the pneuma pervading it, and conditioning life and growth everywhere, is its soul.

Ekpyrosis
The process of differentiation is not eternal; it continues only until the time of the restoration of all things. For the cosmos will in turn decay, and the tension which has been relaxed will again be tightened.  Things will gradually resolve into elements, and the elements into the primary substance, to be consumed in a general conflagration when once more the world will be absorbed in God. This ekpyrôsis is not so much a catastrophic event, but rather the period of the cosmic cycle when the preponderance of the fiery element once again reaches its maximum. All matter is consumed  becoming completely fiery and wholly soul-like. God, at this point, can be regarded as completely existing in itself.

In due order a new cycle of the cosmos begins (palingenesis), reproducing the previous world, and so on forever. Therefore, the same events play out again repeated endlessly. Since the cosmos always unfolds according to the best possible reason, any succeeding world is likely to be identical to the previous one. Thus in the same way that the cosmos occupies a finite space in an infinite void, so it can be understood to occupy a finite period in an infinite span of time.

Ekpyrosis itself however, was not a universally accepted theory by all Stoics. Other prominent stoics such as Panaetius, Zeno of Tarsus, Boethus of Sidon, and others either rejected Ekpyrosis or had differing opinions regarding its degree. A strong acceptance of Aristotle's theories of the universe, combined with a more practical lifestyle practiced by the Roman people, caused the later Stoics to focus their main effort on their own social well-being on earth, not on the cosmos. A prime example are the Stoic-influenced writings of the Roman Emperor Marcus Aurelius (121–180). In his Meditations, he chooses to discuss how one should act and live their life, rather than speculate on cosmological theories.

God

The Stoics attempted to incorporate traditional polytheism into their philosophy. Not only was the primitive substance God, the one supreme being, but divinity could be ascribed to the manifestations—to the heavenly bodies, to the forces of nature, even to deified persons; and thus the world was peopled with divine agencies. Prayer is of apparently little help in a rationally ordered cosmos, and surviving examples of Stoic prayers appear to be more like types of self-meditation than appeals for divine intervention.

The Stoics often identified the universe and God with Zeus, as the ruler and upholder, and at the same time the law, of the universe. The Stoic God is not a transcendent omniscient being standing outside nature, but rather it is immanent—the divine element is immersed in nature itself. God orders the world for the good, and every element of the world contains a portion of the divine element that accounts for its behaviour. The reason of things—that which accounts for them—is not some external end to which they are tending; it is something acting within them, "a spirit deeply interfused," germinating and developing from within.

In one sense the Stoics believed that this is the best of all possible worlds. Only God or Nature is good, and Nature is perfectly rational. It is an organic unity and completely ordered. The goodness of Nature manifests in the way it works to arrange things in the most rational way. For the Stoics this is therefore the most reasonable, the most rational, of all possible worlds.

None of the events which occur by Nature are inherently bad; but nor are they intrinsically 'good' even though they have been caused by a good agent. The natural patterning of the world—life, death, sickness, health, etc.—is made up of morally indifferent events which in themselves are neither good nor bad. Such events are not unimportant, but they only have value in as far as they contribute to a life according to Nature. As reasoning creatures, humans have a share in Nature's rationality. The good for a human is to be fully rational, behaving as Nature does to maintain the natural order. This means to know the logic of the good, to understand the rational explanation of the universe, and the nature and possibilities of being human. The only evil for a human is to behave irrationally—to fail to act upon reason—such a person is insane.

Fate
To the Stoics nothing passes unexplained; there is a reason (Logos) for everything in nature. Because of the Stoics' commitment to the unity and cohesion of the cosmos and its all-encompassing reason, they fully embraced determinism. However instead of a single chain of causal events, there is instead a many-dimensional network of events interacting within the framework of fate. Out of this swarm of causes, the course of events is fully realised. Humans appear to have free will because personal actions participate in the determined chain of events independently of external conditions. This "soft-determinism" allows humans to be responsible for their own actions, alleviating the apparent arbitrariness of fate.

Divination
Divination was an essential element of Greek religion, and the Stoics attempted to reconcile it with their own rational doctrine of strict causation. Since the pneuma of the world-soul pervades the whole universe, this allows human souls to be influenced by divine souls. Omens and portents, Chrysippus explained, are the natural symptoms of certain occurrences. There must be countless indications of the course of providence, for the most part unobserved, the meaning of only a few having become known to humanity. To those who argued that divination was superfluous as all events are foreordained, he replied that both divination and our behaviour under the warnings which it affords are included in the chain of causation.

Mixture
To fully characterize the physical world, the Stoics developed a theory of mixing in which they recognised three types of mixture. The first type was a purely mechanical mixture such as mixing barley and wheat grains together: the individual components maintain their own properties, and they can be separated again. The second type was a fusion, whereby a new substance is created leading to the loss of the properties of the individual components, this roughly corresponds to the modern concept of a chemical change. The third type was a commingling, or total blending: there is complete interpenetration of the components down to the infinitesimal, but each component maintains its own properties. In this third type of mixture a new substance is created, but since it still has the qualities of the two original substances, it is possible to extract them again. In the words of Chrysippus: "there is nothing to prevent one drop of wine from mixing with the whole ocean". Ancient critics often regarded this type of mixing as paradoxical since it apparently implied that each constituent substance be the receptacle of each other. However to the Stoics, the pneuma is like a force, a continuous field interpenetrating matter and spreading through all of space.

Tension
Every character and property of a particular thing is determined solely by the tension in it of pneuma, and pneuma, though present in all things, varies indefinitely in quantity and intensity.
 In the lowest degree of tension the pneuma dwelling in inorganic bodies holds bodies together (whether animate or inanimate) providing cohesion (hexis). This is the type of pneuma present in stone or metal as a retaining principle.
 In the next degree of tension the pneuma provides nature or growth (physis)  to living things. This is the highest level in which it is found in plants.
 In a higher degree of tension the pneuma produces soul (psyche) to all animals, providing them with sensation and impulse.
 In humans can be found the pneuma in its highest form as the rational soul (logike psyche).

A certain warmth, akin to the vital heat of organic being, seems to be found in inorganic nature: vapours from the earth, hot springs, sparks from the flint, were claimed as the last remnant of pneuma not yet utterly slackened and cold. They appealed also to the speed and expansion of gaseous bodies, to whirlwinds and inflated balloons.

Soul
In the rational creatures pneuma is manifested in the highest degree of purity and intensity as an emanation from the world-soul. Humans have souls because the universe has a soul, and human rationality is the same as God's rationality. The pneuma that is soul pervades the entire human body.

The soul is corporeal, else it would have no real existence, would be incapable of extension in three dimensions (i.e. to diffuse all over the body), incapable of holding the body together, herein presenting a sharp contrast to the Epicurean tenet that it is the body which confines and shelters the atoms of soul. This corporeal soul is reason, mind, and ruling principle; in virtue of its divine origin Cleanthes can say to Zeus, "We too are thy offspring," and Seneca can calmly insist that, if man and God are not on perfect equality, the superiority rests rather on our side. What God is for the world, the soul is for humans. The cosmos is a single whole, its variety being referred to varying stages of condensation in pneuma. So, too, the human soul must possess absolute simplicity, its varying functions being conditioned by the degrees of its tension. There are no separate "parts" of the soul, as previous thinkers imagined.

With this psychology is intimately connected the Stoic theory of knowledge. From the unity of soul it follows that all mental processes—sensation, assent, impulse—proceed from reason, the ruling part; the one rational soul alone has sensations, assents to judgments, is impelled towards objects of desire just as much as it thinks or reasons. Not that all these powers at once reach full maturity. The soul at first is empty of content; in the embryo it has not developed beyond the nutritive principle of a plant; at birth the "ruling part" is a blank tablet, although ready prepared to receive writing. The source of knowledge is experience and discursive thought, which manipulates the materials of sense. Our ideas are copied from stored-up sensations.

Just as a relaxation in tension brings about the dissolution of the universe; so in the body, a relaxation of tension, accounts for sleep, decay, and death for the human body. After death the disembodied soul can only maintain its separate existence, even for a limited time, by mounting to that region of the universe which is akin to its nature. It was a moot point whether all souls so survive, as Cleanthes thought, or the souls of the wise and good alone, which was the opinion of Chrysippus; in any case, sooner or later individual souls are merged in the soul of the universe, from which they originated.

Sensation

The Stoics explained perception as a transmission of the perceived quality of an object, by means of the sense organ, into the percipient's mind. The quality transmitted appears as a disturbance or impression upon the corporeal surface of that "thinking thing," the soul. In the example of sight, a conical pencil of rays diverges from the pupil of the eye, so that its base covers the object seen. A presentation is conveyed, by an air-current, from the sense organ, here the eye, to the mind, i.e. the soul's "ruling part." The presentation, besides attesting its own existence, gives further information of its object—such as colour or size. Zeno and Cleanthes compared this presentation to the impression which a seal bears upon wax, while Chrysippus determined it more vaguely as a hidden modification or mode of mind. But the mind is no mere passive recipient of impressions: the mind assents or dissents. The contents of experience are not all true or valid: hallucination is possible; here the Stoics agreed with the Epicureans. It is necessary, therefore, that assent should not be given indiscriminately; we must determine a criterion of truth, a special formal test whereby reason may recognize the merely plausible and hold fast the true.

The earlier Stoics made right reason the standard of truth. Zeno compared sensation to the outstretched hand, flat and open; bending the fingers was assent; the clenched fist was "simple apprehension," the mental grasp of an object; knowledge was the clenched fist tightly held in the other hand. But this criterion was open to the persistent attacks of Epicureans and Academics, who made clear (1) that reason is dependent upon, if not derived from, sense, and (2) that the utterances of reason lack consistency. Chrysippus, therefore, did much to develop Stoic logic, and more clearly defined and safeguarded his predecessors' position.

See also

Notes

a.  Some historians prefer to describe Stoic doctrine as "corporealism" rather than "materialism". One objection to the materialism label relates to a narrow 17th/18th-century conception of materialism whereby things must be "explained by the movements and combination of passive matter". Since Stoicism is vitalistic it is "not materialism in the strict sense". A second objection refers to a Stoic distinction between mere bodies (which extend in three dimensions and offer resistance), and material bodies which are "constituted by the presence with one another of both [active and passive] principles, and by the effects of one principle on the other". The active and passive principles are bodies but not material bodies under this definition.
b.  The concept of pneuma (as a "vital breath") was prominent in the Hellenistic medical schools. Its precise relationship to the "creative fire" (pyr technikon) of the early Stoics is unclear. Some ancient sources state that pneuma was a combination of elemental fire and air (these two elements being "active"). But in Stoic writings pneuma behaves much like the active principle, and it seems they adopted pneuma as a straight swap for the creative fire.

Citations

References

 
 
 
 
 
 
 
 
 
 
 
 
 
 
 

physics
History of physics
Ancient Greek metaphysics
Divination